John Serry may refer to:
 John Serry Sr. (1915–2003), Italian-American concert accordionist, organist, composer, educator
 John Serry Jr. (born 1954), his son, Italian-American jazz pianist, composer